Kappatorquevirus is a genus of viruses, in the family Anelloviridae. Pigs serve as natural hosts. There are two species in this genus. Diseases associated with this genus include: possibly post-weaning multisystemic wasting syndrome (PMWS).

Taxonomy
The genus contains the following species:
Torque teno sus virus k2a
Torque teno sus virus k2b

Structure
Viruses in Kappatorquevirus are non-enveloped, with icosahedral geometries, and T=1 symmetry. The diameter is around 19-27 nm. Genomes are circular, around 2.7kb in length. The genome codes for 4 proteins, and has 3 open reading frames.

Life cycle
Viral replication is nuclear. Entry into the host cell is achieved by penetration into the host cell. Replication follows the ssDNA rolling circle model. DNA-templated transcription, with some alternative splicing mechanism is the method of transcription. The virus exits the host cell by nuclear pore export.
Pigs serve as the natural host. Transmission routes are parental.

References

External links
 Viralzone: Kappatorquevirus
 ICTV

Anelloviridae
Virus genera